Perić or Peric is a surname, very common in Croatia, Serbia, and the Czech Republic.
Notable people with the surname include:

Borislava Perić (born 1972), Serbian table tennis player
Darko Perić (born 1978), Croatian football player
Dragan Perić (born 1964), retired Serbian shot putter and discus thrower
Janko Peric (born 1949), former Canadian politician
Milan Perić (born 1986), Serbian footballer
Nedjeljko Perić (born 1950), Croatian engineer
Nicolás Peric (born 1978), Chilean goalkeeper of Croatian origin
Ozren Perić (born 1987), Bosnian footballer
Ratko Perić (born 1944), Bishop of Mostar-Duvno and Apostolic Administrator of Trebinje-Mrkan
Sladan Peric (born 1982), Danish professional football player
Stjepan Perić (born 1983), Croatian actor
Valter Perić (1919–1945), resistance leader in Sarajevo during World War II

Another version of the same surname is Perich:
 Anton Perich (born 1945), Croatian-American filmmaker, photographer, and video artist
 Cheryl Perich, American teacher whose wrongful termination lawsuit was the impetus for the U.S. Supreme Court case of Hosanna-Tabor Evangelical Lutheran Church and School v. EEOC
 Guillermo Perich, Cuban violinist
 Tristan Perich (born 1982), American contemporary composer

See also
 Peri (name)

Croatian surnames
Serbian surnames
Patronymic surnames